José Manuel Calderón Portillo (born 7 January 2000) is a Spanish professional footballer. He plays mainly an left back, he can also play as a left winger.

Club career
Born in Paradas, Seville, Andalusia, Calderón joined Real Betis' youth setup in 2017, after representing Calavera CF and Escuela Base Marchena. He made his senior debut with the reserves on 16 December 2018, starting in a 0–2 Tercera División away loss against Puente Genil FC.

On 3 July 2019, Calderón renewed his contract until 2023. He scored his first senior goals on 15 September 2019, netting a brace for the B's in a 3–1 win at Xerez CD.

Calderón made his first team – and La Liga – debut on 14 August 2021, coming on as a first-half substitute for injured Álex Moreno in a 1–1 away draw against RCD Mallorca. On 4 October, however, he was released by the club due to disciplinary reasons.

Career statistics

Club

References

External links
 
 
 

2000 births
Living people
People from Campiña de Morón y Marchena
Sportspeople from the Province of Seville
Spanish footballers
Footballers from Andalusia
Association football defenders
Association football wingers
La Liga players
Primera Federación players
Segunda División B players
Tercera División players
Betis Deportivo Balompié footballers
Real Betis players